A hairpin turn (also hairpin bend or hairpin corner) is a bend in a road with a very acute inner angle, making it necessary for an oncoming vehicle to turn about 180° to continue on the road. It is named for its resemblance to a bent metal hairpin. Such turns in ramps and trails may be called switchbacks in American English, by analogy with switchback railways.

Description 
Hairpin turns are often built when a route climbs up or down a steep slope, so that it can travel mostly across the slope with only moderate steepness, and are often arrayed in a zigzag pattern. Highways with repeating hairpin turns allow easier, safer ascents and descents of mountainous terrain than a direct, steep climb and descent, at the price of greater distances of travel and usually lower speed limits, due to the sharpness of the turn. Highways of this style are also generally less costly to build and maintain than highways with tunnels.

On occasion, the road may loop completely, using a tunnel or bridge to cross itself at a different elevation (example on Reunion Island). When this routing geometry is used for a rail line, it is called a spiral, or spiral loop.

In trail building, an alternative to switchbacks is the stairway.

Roads with hairpin turns 

Some roads with switchbacks (hairpin turns) include:

Europe 
United Kingdom:

 The UK, in particular mountainous Scotland, has many mountain passes with hairpin bends; the Pass of the Cattle (Bealach na Bà) in Scotland has many such turns.
Zig Zag Hill in Dorset, England, part of the B3081, is known for being one of the bendiest roads in the country.

Continental Europe:
Alpe d'Huez in the French Alps, famous for its 21 hairpin bends
Stelvio Pass (German: Stilfserjoch) with its 48 hairpin bends (Italian: tornanti; German Spitzkehren) on the northern ramp is one of the most famous Alpine Mountain passes
Transfăgărăşan in the Romanian Carpathians (Fagaras Mountains), famous for its hairpin bends
 In rallying, the cars slide sideways around hairpins in spectacular style, such as at the Col de Turini of the Monte Carlo Rally
Hillclimbing is a special kind of automobile racing mainly held of mountain roads with hairpins, which keeps average speeds lower than on tracks
 In bicycle racing, climbs up mountains roads with many U-turns are considered the most difficult, and often feature in Tour de France, Giro d'Italia, Tour de Suisse and also Vuelta a España
 The roads above Monaco, on the foothills of the Alps; also seen in Hitchcock's To Catch a Thief and the Loews Hairpin at the Circuit de Monaco
 The road between Lysefjord and the mountain plateau has 27 hairpin bends
 The Trollstigen road in Rauma, Norway, from Åndalsnes to Valldal has 11 characteristic bends.
 The Geiranger road from Geirangerfjord to the mountain pass (now road 63) won the gold medal on the world exhibition, Paris 1900, the original design included a 270° spiral.
Norwegian National Road 7 through Måbødalen has a spiral partly within tunnels.
 The road from Frangokastello to Kallikratis in Crete has 27 tight bends. Due to the mountainous profile of the country, many public streets in Greece have tight bends. The asphalt is also slippery in these areas, making it easy to lose traction (and thus control). The situation worsens with the first rains after the long dry summer, making the asphalt more slippery than usual.
 The Veleta access road in Granada, Spain is the highest paved road in Europe

North America 

 USA - city streets:
 Winters Street (Sacramento, California)
 Vermont Street (San Francisco, California)
 Lombard Street (San Francisco, California)
 Snake Alley (Burlington, Iowa)
 Mountain Road (Jersey City, New Jersey)
 Shippen Street (Weehawken, New Jersey)
 US Highways:
 US 6 through Loveland Pass over the Continental Divide in Colorado (N39.65726, W105.87456)
 US 44/NY 55 on the east face of the Shawangunk Ridge in Gardiner (N41.73803, W74.18433).
 US 93 used to be on both the Nevada and Arizona sides of Hoover Dam, though these sections were bypassed by a new highway alignment and bridge south of the dam that opened in 2010 (N36.01612, W114.73716)
 US 250 between the West Virginia border and West Augusta, Virginia　(N38.44073, W79.63908)
 US 191 (Coronado Trail Scenic Byway) in Arizona between Morenci and Alpine), has a few switchbacks and about 460 curves.(N33.16616, W109.36697)
 US 441 through Great Smoky Mountains National Park on the Tennessee/North Carolina border. (N35.60273, W83.41527)
 US 212 contains 19 switchbacks in the Beartooth Mountains. This section is commonly known as Beartooth Highway.
 US 40 over Berthoud Pass in Colorado. (N39.84474, W105.7578)
 US 550 in Colorado between Silverton and Ouray, nicknamed the "Million Dollar Highway" (N37.87297, W107.73610)
 US 34 in Colorado in Rocky Mountain National Park has 10 switchbacks on Trail Ridge Road
 US 74A in North Carolina between Gerton and Fairview (N35.4924355, W82.3618645)
 US State Highways:
 AZ 89A as it enters Oak Creek Canyon in Arizona.
 AR 7 in various places in Arkansas
 CA 1 south of Bodega Bay, California; it is shown in Alfred Hitchcock's film The Birds, is still in use, and looks much as it did during the filming in the early 1960s
 CA 74/Seven-Level Hill south of Palm Desert, California, featured in the film It's a Mad, Mad, Mad, Mad World
 CA 92 southwest of the San Andreas Fault
 CA 120 west of Groveland, California is known as Priest Grade, a dangerous road on the way to Yosemite National Park.
 CA 130 Originally built as a wagon trail to aid in the construction of Lick Observatory, "Mt. Hamilton Road" travels east out of San Jose, CA and rises over the foothills, only to ascend again up the summit of Mt. Hamilton. It has a total of 365 curves and switchbacks: "...one for every day of the year"
 CA 142 southwest of Chino Hills has 2 hairpin turns to scale a small cliff.
 CA 152 east of Watsonville, California is known as Highway 152 or Hecker Pass; from Casserly Rd to Whitehurst Rd it curves and makes a hairpin turn just past the "Mt. Madona Inn" Restaurant
 CA 198 on the ascent from the Kaweah River canyon to the Giant Forest area of Sequoia National Park; this portion of CA 198 is known as Generals Highway
 CO 5, the highest paved road in North America, has three switchbacks as it ascends from Echo Lake Park in Clear Creek County, Colorado, and an additional 12 switchbacks on its final approach to the summit of Mount Evans. It forms half of the Mount Evans Scenic Byway.
 CO 82 has one switchback on the western approach, and three on the east, at Independence Pass on the Lake–Pitkin county line, the highest paved crossing of the Continental Divide in the US
 MA 2, the Mohawk Trail in the Berkshire Mountains
 NH 112, west of Kancamagus Pass in the White Mountains (New Hampshire)
 NJ 495 just after leaving the Lincoln Tunnel toll plaza in Union City. Eastbound traffic loops underneath itself to enter the Lincoln Tunnel. It is known as The Helix.
 NY 950A (West Bank Perimeter Road) has a hairpin turn (known locally as the Horseshoe) around Pierce Run in South Valley, built to keep the road above the Allegheny Reservoir's floodplain. A portion of another hairpin turn on the same road straddles State Line Run on the New York-Pennsylvania border.
 PA 74 has a pair of hairpin turns on the north side of Tuscarora Mountain in Juniata County, Pennsylvania.
 PA 74 has a hairpin turn on the north side of Blue Mountain in Perry County, Pennsylvania.
 PA 191 south of Stroudsburg on the north side of Blue Mountain in Monroe County, Pennsylvania.
 PA 225 on Peters Mountain north of the borough of Dauphin.
 PA 641 on Tuscarora Mountain in Franklin County and Huntingdon County.
 Laurel Run Road in Laurel Run, Pennsylvania (near Wilkes-Barre) consists of multiple hairpin turns and the maximum grade is almost 20%. The Giants Despair Hillclimb occurs annually on it.
 Historic US 66 (Oatman Highway) between Kingman and Oatman, through Sitgreaves Pass in the Black Mountains, Arizona
 Palomar Mountain Road, also known as South Grade Road, in San Diego County has 21 switchbacks
 Greenwood Station Road (US Bicycle Route 76) in Albemarle County, Virginia near Crozet with a signed "5 mph" hairpin turn. (N38.054588, W78.770537)
W Road north of Chattanooga, Tennessee on Signal Mountain
Interstate 476 (the Northeast Extension of the Pennsylvania Turnpike) in Clarks Summit, Pennsylvania. This is done in order to ease the grade for trucks. Northbound traffic descends from Bald Mountain into the Chinchilla Valley just before the toll plaza.

Mexico:

 Mexican Autopista 95D has a famous hairpin turn which is known as La Pera (The Pear), because it somewhat resembles the shape of that fruit.

Canada:

 The Crowsnest Highway in British Columbia, Canada, east of Osoyoos has several hairpin turns.
 A sharp hairpin turn on British Columbia Highway 97 alongside Vaseux Lake near Oliver, British Columbia, has been the scene of many accidents and deaths.
 Nova Scotia Highway 105, part of the Trans-Canada Highway, in Cape Breton has a hairpin turn after peaking Kelly's Mountain before descending to cross the Seal Island Bridge.
 The Duffy Lake Road (Highway 99) in British Columbia descending into Pemberton from Lillooet (50°18'4.31"N, 122°35'4.50"W).
 A hairpin turn exists in Edmonton, Alberta, at the intersection of Saskatchewan Drive and the one-way Queen Elizabeth Park Road.

South America 

Chile:

 The Paso Internacional Los Libertadores has several switchbacks on the Chilean side of the pass. 26 below the tunnel entrance alone.

Asia 

 In China, 
 99 turns at Baxoi, part of China National Highway 318,
 72 turns at Nujiang, part of China National Highway 318.

 In India, 

 Agumbe Ghat road from Udupi to Teerthahalli in Karnataka have 13 hairpin turns. In fact, most of the Ghats include at least one hairpin turn.

 Gata Loops, a part of the route from Manali to Leh.

 Namakkal-Kolli Hills Ghat road has 70 hairpin bends to reach the top of the hills.

 Ponmudi Hills in Kerala has 22 hairpin bends to reach the hill top.

 Valparai-Pollachi road has hairpin bend with 40 bends.

 Z-Morh in Kashmir has two consecutive hairpin bends, hence the name "Z-Morh" (Z-Bend).

 In Indonesia, there are two sections of road in West Sumatra particularly famous for its hairpins:
Kelok Ampek-Puluh-Ampek near Lake Maninjau, and 
 Kelok Sembilan near Payakumbuh.

 In Japan, there is the known Nikkō Irohazaka, a one-way switchback mountain road (there are 2 separate roads; up and down), located at Nikko, Tochigi. This road plays a significant role in Japanese history: The route was popular with Buddhist pilgrims on their way to Lake Chūzenji, which is at the top of the forested hill that this road climbs. There are 48 hairpin turns, each labeled with one of the 48 characters in the kana syllabary; while the narrow road has been modernized over the years, care has been taken to keep the number of curves constant. In Aomori Prefecture, the Tsugaru Iwaki Skyline is a toll road that allows drivers to ascend  with an average gradient of 8.66% and sections up to 10%; to 8th station on the stratovolcano, Mount Iwaki. The road is considered to be one of the most dangerous mountain roads in the world due to the gradient and the constant 69 hairpin turns.

 In Macau, a part of the Guia Circuit is a hairpin turn.

 In Myanmar, The World War II–era Burma Road, constructed over the rugged terrain between the (then) British colony of Burma and China has many hairpin curves to accommodate traffic to supply China, then otherwise isolated by sea and land.

 In Nepal, B.P. Koirala Highway, that links Kathmandu Valley with the Eastern Terai region, and Tribhuvan Highway that links Kathmandu with the Indian border, have many hairpin bends.

 In Philippines, Kennon Road on the way to/from Baguio has many hairpin turns. Also in Rizal, Cagayan, the road besides mountains and rivers have hairpin turns.

 In Sri Lanka, on the 41 km long Kandy-Padiyathalawa road via Mahiyangana there are 18 hairpin bends, popularly known as Daha ata wanguwa.

Australia 
 The Mount Hotham Pass on the Great Alpine Road in Victoria has numerous hairpin bends, as do the other roads in the region.
 Galston Gorge in New South Wales. Vehicles like towed caravans are forbidden on this road, lest the caravan gets jammed and delays other traffic. Special penalties apply if overlength vehicles attempted to take this route.
 Macquarie Pass in New South Wales, which winds through Macquarie Pass National Park has numerous hairpin bends which used to be so tight that semi-trailers had to stop and reverse to get around.
 Kangaroo Valley Road in New South Wales, located near Berry.
 Ben Lomond Road in Tasmania has 6 hairpin bends known as "Jacobs Ladder", which is a popular descent for cyclists.
 Corkscrew Road in Montacute, South Australia starts at Gorge Road and winds, as its name suggests, up to Montacute Road. This  road has become famous through the Tour Down Under King of the Mountain climb for the difficulty of riding up the steep and sharp bends.

Motorsports 

 Fairmont Hotel Hairpin is the slowest turn in Formula One.
 Many venues used for motor racing incorporate hairpin turns in the racecourse even if the terrain is relatively level. In this case the purpose is to provide a greater challenge to the drivers, to increase overtaking opportunities or simply increase the lap length without increasing the area occupied by the track.
 The eleventh turn at Sonoma Raceway is a hairpin turn used in NASCAR.
 Turn 14 at the Shanghai International Circuit, taken at just 65 km/h (40 mph).

Bicycles
The eastern ramp of the Liniebrug, a bike and footbridge built over the Amsterdam-Rhine Canal near Nigtevecht in the Netherlands in 2018, consists of a pair of hairpin bends.

Railways 
If a railway curves back on itself like a hairpin turn, it is called a horseshoe curve. The Pennsylvania Railroad built one in Blair County, Pennsylvania, which ascends the Eastern Continental Divide from the east. However, the radius of curvature is much larger than that of a typical road hairpin. See this example at Zlatoust or Hillclimbing for other railway ascent methods.

Skiing 
Sections known as hairpins are also found in the slalom discipline of alpine skiing. A hairpin consists of two consecutive vertical or "closed gates", which must be negotiated very quickly. Three or more consecutive closed gates are known as a flush.

See also 
 Dead Man's Curve
 Spiral bridge
 Zig zag (railway)
 U-turn

References

External links 

Motorsport terminology
Road transport
Road hazards